Ourika River is a river in Morocco, at . It rises in the High Atlas and flows through the Ourika Valley, 30 km from Marrakech.

Natural history
A number of interesting plants have been recorded in this valley beginning in the late 19th century including Fraxinus dimorpha. This valley is the sole location within the High Atlas Range where the endangered primate Barbary macaque, Macaca sylvanus is known to occur; this primate is found in the Middle Atlas and a few disjunctive populations in Algeria and Gibraltar.

Ourika Valley, due to its many waterfalls and several attractions, is a very popular Ourika day trip from Marrakech.
 
The region is inhabited by Berber people who practice a traditional way of life. Despite its proximity to Marrakech, it is still considered relatively "unspoiled".

References

Notes 
 C. Michael Hogan (2008). Barbary Macaque: Macaca sylvanus. Globaltwitcher.com, ed. Nicklas Stromberg.
 Joseph Dalton Hooker, John Ball and George Maw (1878). Journal of a Tour in Marocco and the Great Atlas. Macmillan and Company.

External links

Atlas Mountains
Rivers of Morocco